Patience is the twelfth studio album by New Zealand noise rock band The Dead C, released on 12 October 2010 through Ba Da Bing Records.

Track listing

Personnel 
The Dead C – production
Michael Morley – instruments
Bruce Russell – instruments
Robbie Yeats – instruments

References

External links 
 

2010 albums
The Dead C albums
Ba Da Bing Records albums